Eurema salome, the Salome yellow, is a butterfly in the family Pieridae. It is found from Peru northward through tropical America. It is an extremely rare migrant to the lower Rio Grande Valley in Texas. The habitat consists of forest openings and edges and roadcuts.

The wings are yellow, the upper surface of the forewings with black margins projecting into the yellow ground color. Males have a black border on the hindwings, while females are lacking this border. Both sexes have tail-like hindwing projections. Adults are on wing from August to September in southern Texas and all year round in the tropics. Adults feed on flower nectar of a wide variety of flowers.

The larvae feed on Diphysa species.

Subspecies
The following subspecies are recognized:
E. s. salome (Peru)
E. s. limoneus (C. & R. Felder, 1861) (Venezuela)
E. s. gaugamela (C. & R. Felder, [1865]) (Colombia, Venezuela)
E. s. jamapa (Reakirt, 1866) (Mexico)
E. s. xystra (d'Almeida, 1936) (Ecuador)

References

salome
Butterflies of North America
Butterflies of Central America
Pieridae of South America
Fauna of the Amazon
Butterflies described in 1861
Taxa named by Baron Cajetan von Felder
Taxa named by Rudolf Felder